Batrachorhina griseofasciata is a species of beetle in the family Cerambycidae. It was described by Stephan von Breuning in 1938. It is known from the Democratic Republic of the Congo.

References

Batrachorhina
Beetles described in 1938
Endemic fauna of the Democratic Republic of the Congo